Marsh rat can refer to several not closely related types of semiaquatic rodents of superfamily Muroidea:

Dasymys, about ten species from Africa in the family Muridae;
African marsh rat or common dasymys (D. incomtus)
Angolan marsh rat (D. nudipes)
Holochilus, three species from South America in the family Cricetidae;
Amazonian marsh rat, common marsh rat or simply the marsh rat (H. sciureus)
Brazilian marsh rat or web-footed marsh rat (H. brasiliensis) 
Chacoan marsh rat (H. chacarius)
Greater marsh rat (Lundomys molitor), a cricetid from southeastern South America;
Marsh rice rat (Oryzomys palustris), a cricetid from southeastern North America.

Animal common name disambiguation pages